Affectionately Yours is a 1941 American romantic comedy film directed by Lloyd Bacon and starring Merle Oberon, Dennis Morgan, and Rita Hayworth.

Plot 
Foreign correspondent Rickey Mayberry (Dennis Morgan) hurriedly flies back from Portugal to the U.S. to keep his wife from divorcing him, but he's followed on the flight by love interest Irene Malcolm (Rita Hayworth). Mayberry's wife Sue (Merle Oberon) has indeed divorced him, although she still loves him.  The comedy of errors is compounded by Irene and also by Rickey's boss (James Gleason), who both conspire to keep the couple apart.

Cast 
 Merle Oberon as Sue Mayberry
 Dennis Morgan as "Rickey" Mayberry
 Rita Hayworth as Irene Malcolm
 Ralph Bellamy as Owen Wright
 George Tobias as Pasha
 James Gleason as "Chet" Phillips
 Hattie McDaniel as Cynthia the cook
 Jerome Cowan as "Pappy" Cullen
 Butterfly McQueen as Butterfly
 Renie Riano as Mrs. Snell
 Frank Wilcox as "Tommy"
 Grace Stafford as "Chickie" Anderson
 Carmen Morales as Anita
 Murray Alper as Blair
 William Haade as Matthews
 Pat Flaherty as Harmon
 James Flavin as Tomassetti

Cast notes
 Uncredited actors in the film include Dorothy Adams, Sidney Bracey, Glen Cavender, Gino Corrado, Charles Drake, Faye Emerson, Frank Faylen, Mary Field, Edward Gargan, Fred Graham, Creighton Hale, Stuart Holmes, William Hopper, George Meeker, Jack Mower, Wedgwood Nowell, Alexis Smith, and Craig Stevens.

External links 

 
 Turner Classic Movies page
 
 

1941 films
Films directed by Lloyd Bacon
Warner Bros. films
1941 romantic comedy films
American romantic comedy films
American black-and-white films
1940s English-language films
1940s American films